Programming Research Limited (PRQA) was a United Kingdom-based developer of code quality management software for embedded software, which included the static program analysis tools QA·C and QA·C++, now known as Helix QAC. It created the High Integrity C++ software coding standard.  In May 2018, the company was acquired by Minneapolis, MNbased Perforce, and its products were renamed.

References

External links
 Programming Research Limited website

Borough of Elmbridge
Companies based in Surrey
Privately held companies of the United Kingdom
Science and technology in Surrey
Software companies of the United Kingdom